Count Andrzej Artur Zamoyski (2 April 1800 – 29 October 1874) was a Polish  nobleman, landowner and political and economic activist.

Zamoyski organized meetings of landowners (Klemensowczycy) at his Klemensów estate in the Polish Congress Poland. In 1842 he became co-publisher of the Rocznik Gospodarstwa Krajowego (Polish Farming Annual). In 1848 he founded the Steam Navigation Company and thereafter monopolized transport on the Vistula River. He also initiated the building of steamships and barges. He was the founder and chairman of an Agricultural Society.

Zamoyski was an opponent of Aleksander Wielopolski and a principal figure in the Biali (Whites) political faction. Exiled in September 1863, he settled in France, becoming part of the Polish Great Emigration. In 1872 he was inducted into the Polish Academy of Learning.

See also
List of Poles

1800 births
1874 deaths
Polish politicians
19th-century Polish businesspeople
Andrzej Artur